Crocodile lizard may refer to:

 Chinese crocodile lizard (Shinisaurus crocodilurus), a semiaquatic lizard of China and Vietnam
 Crocodilurus, a monotypic lizard genus native to South America

Animal common name disambiguation pages